Bence Kiss (born 1 July 1999) is a Hungarian footballer who plays as midfielder for Győr.

Club career
On 21 June 2022, Kiss signed a one-year contract with Győr.

References 

1999 births
People from Celldömölk
Sportspeople from Vas County
Living people
Hungarian footballers
Hungary youth international footballers
Hungary under-21 international footballers
Association football midfielders
Szombathelyi Haladás footballers
Kazincbarcikai SC footballers
Győri ETO FC players
Nemzeti Bajnokság I players
Nemzeti Bajnokság II players